Catoctin Quaker Camp (CQC) is a small Quaker residential-wilderness summer camp located near Frederick, Maryland operated by Baltimore Yearly Meeting. It hosts to both Quaker and non-Quaker children between the ages of 9–14, organizing them by age into "units," or groups of campers who share cabins and go on trips together. During their time at camp — two to four weeks — children are taught Quaker values of simplicity, equality, and peace, and the benefits of living in an intentional, child-centered, loving community.

Each session consists of eight days in-camp alongside two three-day trips, which often take the forms of canoeing, backpacking, rock climbing, tubing, or participating in various other outdoor activities. Oldest campers participate in a ten-day-long trip, aptly named "The Ten Day", which is a journey into the mountains of Maryland, Virginia, Pennsylvania, and West Virginia. In-camp activities include swimming in the lagoon (nicknamed the "goon"), arts and crafts, chores, games, sports, Quaker worship at the fire circle, singing, and other arts activities.

The camp property, owned by Baltimore Yearly Meeting since 1953, is protected by a conservation easement with the state of Maryland. It is home to several rare plant species as well as geological rarities such as Catoctin Greenstone, which can be found in the walls of the main lodge. The large preserved beams and rafters of the lodge are made from American Chestnut trunks formed before the chestnut blight.

References

 The book "The Last Runaway" by Tracy Chevalier is dedicated to Catoctin Quaker Camp and Oberlin College

External links
Catoctin Quaker Camp Home Page

Summer camps in Maryland
Quakerism in Maryland